Stephens Creek can refer to:

 Stephens Creek (New South Wales), Australia
 Stephens Creek Dam, a reservoir on the creek
 Stephens Creek (Oregon), United States

See also
Stevens Creek (disambiguation)